Wedge Island is a 400-metre (1,300 ft) long wedge shaped island north of Lancelin and south of Cervantes on the Western Australian coast. The island is located just south of “the point” and approximately 15km south-east of an informal settlement known as Grey village with which it often shares a name. Both are within the Shire of Dandaragan.

Geography

Wedge can also be accessed in a 4WD vehicle, via the beach if the tide is out. The beach is very soft during summer and many vehicles become bogged or are swept into the water. There is no access at any time through the military range. Trespassers face large fines and possible loss of their vehicle if caught.

History

Wedge Island was named after government surveyor Charles Wedge, in 1875 by Staff-Commander William Edwin Archdeacon R.N., who was in charge of the Admiralty  survey of the coast of  Western  Australia.

The settlement is now home to approximately 350 beach shacks on unvested land that are used by crayfishermen and holiday-goers.  A new sealed road, Indian Ocean Drive was opened in September 2010 which provides 2WD access to Wedge. There are claims that this has changed the local environment. The road, intended to promote tourism is well known for a number of serious vehicle crashes since it opened. 

Wedge is often quiet during the cooler months but during major public holidays such as Christmas, New Year's Day and Australia Day there are people in nearly every shack. Camping in the area is now officially prohibited. However it has been estimated that 14,000 individuals may use the shacks at Wedge and Grey.  There are no shops nor running water, and generators are common without mains electricity.  Activities include four wheel driving, sand boarding, surfing and kitesurfing, fishing, swimming and snorkeling. Motorbike riding has been banned in the area surrounding Wedge Island after many accidents resulted in people needing to be air lifted to get medical attention. The ranger now hands out fines to those caught using unlicensed vehicles in the vicinity, or leaving rubbish there.

A man was fatally stabbed during a beach party on the northern side of Wedge in December 2013, after a brawl broke out.  The New Year's Eve party involved more than 600 people.

The WA Government has considered the removal of the shacks on Wedge in line with government policy.  In March 2010, the Minister for the Environment Donna Faragher announced that she would not be seeking an end to the leases at Wedge and Grey until compromise options were considered by government.

In April 2011, a WA Legislative Council Standing Committee found that coastal shacks should be removed to protect the environment from "unplanned growth". The shack leases were due to expire on 30 June 2011 but the Wedge community won a one-year renewal for all occupied facilities.

Wedge and Grey are in an area subject to summer bushfires and visitors in beach shacks are sometimes asked to relocate.

References

External links
 Slideshow of images of Wedge Island from the BBC World Service
 Geoscience Gazetteer of Australia
 Wedge Island Community page
 Wedge Island Information Page
  Wedge and Grey Master Plan 2000
  Radio National - Wedge Island documentary and comments
 Environment and Public Affairs Committee : Inquiry into Shack Sites in WA

Turquoise Coast (Western Australia)
Nature reserves in Western Australia